Kyãk (Nyakyak), also known as Bambuka after its location, is a Bikwin (Adamawa) language of Nigeria.

Blench lists Kanawa as a possible separate language.

References

Languages of Nigeria
Bambukic languages